Army Group Rear Area Command was an area of military jurisdiction behind each of the three Wehrmacht army groups from 1941, the German invasion of the Soviet Union in Operation Barbarossa, through 1944 when the pre-war territories of the Soviet Union were recovered. The areas were sites of mass murder during the Holocaust and other crimes against humanity targeting the civilian population.

Background and planning
During the early stages of the planning for the invasion of the Soviet Union, Operation Barbarossa, the rear areas behind the front lines were envisioned to be subordinated to the respective armies, as they had during the invasion of Poland. By early April 1941, however, the military planners decided to limit the areas of army jurisdiction, with the bulk of the territory to be controlled by the Army Group Rear Areas.

The planners envisioned that the occupied territories would quickly pass onto civilian administration; thus, the directives called for the Army Group Rear Areas commanders to concentrate on the security of lines of communication and important military installations, such as storage depots and aerodromes. Army Group Rear Areas were also responsible for the transfer of prisoners of war to the rear.

Organisation

Army Group North, Army Group Centre and Army Group South Rear Area Commands were responsible for the rear area security in their respective areas of operation. Each had a headquarters subordinated to the corresponding army group, while also reporting to the Wehrmacht Quartermaster General Eduard Wagner, who had responsibility for rear security.

Army Group Rear Area commanders controlled nine Security Divisions, tasked with security of communications and supply lines, economic exploitation and combating irregular fighters (partisans) behind the front line. Security Divisions also oversaw units of the Geheime Feldpolizei (Secret Field Police) of the Wehrmacht. Rear Area commanders operated in parallel with the Higher SS and Police Leaders appointed by the head of the SS, Heinrich Himmler, for each of the army group rear areas. In the words of historian Michael Parrish, these army commanders "presided over an empire of terror and brutality".

Security warfare and atrocities

The area commanders' duties included security of communications and supply lines, economic exploitation and combating guerillas (partisans) in Wehrmacht's rear areas. In addition to the Wehrmacht security forces, the SS and the SD formations operated in the same areas, under the command of the respective Higher SS and Police Leaders. These units included Einsatzgruppen detachments, three police regiments (North, Centre and South), the Waffen-SS units of the Kommandostab Reichsführer-SS, and additional Ordnungspolizei (Order Police Battalions), which units perpetrated mass murder during The Holocaust in the areas of military jurisdiction.

The security formations, often in coordination with or under the leadership of the Wehrmacht, conducted security operations against the civilian population, under the doctrine of Partisanenkrieg (later Bandenbekämpfung, or "bandit fighting"). "Anti-partisan operations"  in "bandit-infested" areas amounted to destruction of villages, seizure of livestock, deporting of able-bodied population for slave labour to Germany and murder of those of non-working age. In its reports, the Wehrmacht units euphemistically described the operations as "elimination of partisan nests, partisan camps, partisan bunkers". Their records show that in the early phases of the occupation, in 1941–42, Wehrmacht security divisions lost one soldier killed for every 100 "partisans" that died, with the Jewish population making up the majority of the victims. In the Army Group Centre Rear Area, 80,000 "suspected partisans" were killed between June 1941 and May 1942, for 1,094 German casualties.

Commanders
Army Group North Rear Area

Army Group Centre Rear Area

Army Group South Rear Area

See also
 Chief of Civil Administration

References

Citations

Bibliography

 
 
 
 
 
 
 
 
 

Military history of the Soviet Union during World War II
1941 establishments in the Soviet Union
1944 disestablishments in the Soviet Union
States and territories established in 1941
States and territories disestablished in 1944
Military units and formations established in 1941
Military units and formations disestablished in 1944
Army groups of the German Army in World War II
War crimes of the Wehrmacht